St Anne's Church was opened on 25 October 1772. It had been built at the expense of Thomas and Richard Dobb, cabinetmakers, of Williamson Square and Henry North, fruit merchant, Dale Street. They owned the land on which it was built. At the time the area was still quite rural. They applied to Parliament of Great Britain for the passage of the Richmond Chapel, Lancashire Act 1772 to enable the completion of the church as a chapel of ease.

The first rector was Claudius Crigan, who had been an army chaplain in Antigua. He married Mary Harman, the widow of a wealthy slave owner, and retired from the army. The church provided services for wealthy inhabitants of Liverpool, raising money
to pay the rector by selling pews for sixty and seventy guineas with no free pews. Poet Mary Rolls was married here in 1810. An example of the congregation is Robert Bostock of Tarleton Street, who occupied three pews.

References

History of Liverpool
1772 establishments in England